Krystal Forscutt (married name Krystal Hipwell) is an Australian former model and reality television contestant. Since then she has gone into work as a waitress and as a personal trainer.

Biography

Reality television
Forscutt previously modelled for men's magazines and came to prominence as a contestant in the Australian Big Brother series in 2006. She has had her breast size increased with breast implants, which she got with her mother Karen Forscutt (who also appeared with her in Big Brother). In 2007 she appeared as a contestant on the Australian reality television show It Takes Two.

Modelling
Forscutt went on to appear regularly in Australian men's magazines Zoo Weekly, FHM and Ralph. She appeared in the video game Need for Speed: ProStreet, which makes her the first Australian to have a character in the game. The representatives of Electronic Arts approached Forscutt to appear in the new Need For Speed video game, after they spotted her in a bikini shoot in Zoo Weekly. Forscutt was flown to EA's Vancouver headquarters where she was photographed and filmed for artists to create her character, a starting girl in the race series.

Television and acting
In January 2008, Forscutt became a regular guest on the Bigpond GameArena Benny and Richie show, and in October appeared in an episode of Seven Network's Packed to the Rafters. In May 2009, Forscutt appeared in the music video for the Steve Forde song “Guns & Guitars”. Forscutt briefly pursued a movie career in Hollywood. As of 2010 she had relocated to Melbourne. On 29 July 2010, she made an appearance on The Matty Johns Show.

Music
In November 2010, Krystal Forscutt spoke to the Herald Sun about her upcoming venture in music. She stated that she was a part of a girl group called "Video Girl" and that the group had already recorded their debut album and were in the process of putting together a show to perform at gigs. Forscutt said she would sing and DJ in the group. The band was supposed to release music in 2011; however, music industry sources indicated that Forscutt's music career had been cut short.

References

External links
 
 Watch out for the imitation Krystal. Herald Sun.
 Krystal's first Ben and Richie appearance
 Guns and Guitars Music Video – featuring Krystal Forscutt

Big Brother (Australian TV series) contestants
Australian female models
Living people
Australian exercise instructors
Year of birth missing (living people)